Daniel la Torre Regal (born 20 August 1997) is a Peruvian badminton player.

Career 
In 2015, he was the mixed doubles runner-up at the South America U-19 Championships and also at the Colombia International tournament with Daniela Macías. In 2017, he teamed-up with Dánica Nishimura, started their success by becoming the runner-up at the Peru International Series. The duo won their first title together at the Carebaco International. He competed at the 2018 South American Games, winning a gold, a silver, and two bronze medals.

Achievements

South American Games 
Men's singles

Men's doubles

Mixed doubles

BWF International Challenge/Series (6 titles, 2 runners-up) 
Men's doubles

Mixed doubles

  BWF International Challenge tournament
  BWF International Series tournament
  BWF Future Series tournament

References

External links 
 

Living people
1997 births
Sportspeople from Lima
Peruvian male badminton players
Badminton players at the 2019 Pan American Games
Pan American Games competitors for Peru
South American Games gold medalists for Peru
South American Games silver medalists for Peru
South American Games bronze medalists for Peru
South American Games medalists in badminton
Competitors at the 2018 South American Games
21st-century Peruvian people